The Molla Hassan Kāshi Mausoleum is a free-standing isolated edifice located 2.5 km to the south of Soltaniyeh, Iran. This 16th-century mausoleum was built during Shah Tahmasp I, to honor Molla Hassan Kāshi, a 14th-century mystic whose recasting of Islam's historical sagas as Persian poetic epics unwittingly had a vast influence over Shia Islam's future direction.

Specifications
The monument is composed of a small esplanade serving as an entrance, and the mausoleum itself. The mausoleum displays an octagonal plan from the exterior though it is, in reality, a 6x6 meter square hall with additional galleries at the corners giving the aspect of an octagon. The mausoleum's octagonal exterior is uniquely shaped with four sides measuring 80.3 meters in length, and the other four sides measuring 5.75 meters in length.

In each gallery, there is a narrow staircase leading to an upper storey. The square building is roofed with a double-shelled dome, which has another layer of blue glazed bricks consisting of repeating geometric designs, as well as repeating Kufic calligraphy. The interior decoration of stucco stalactites was done at the time of Fath-Ali Shah, a Qajar king, in the early 19th century.

See also
 Iranian architecture

References 

Buildings and structures completed in the 16th century
Safavid architecture
Buildings and structures in Zanjan Province